Manukau United FC are an association football club based in  Māngere East, Auckland, New Zealand. Formed through a partnership of Manukau City and Mangere United in 2018, Manukau United currently play in the Northern League.

Recent history

The club was founded as Manukau City in 1964, growing over the years into a club with 200 people involved across 13 teams. Manukau United Football Club is a partnership club representing South Auckland communities in the Lotto NRFL Premier League and provides grassroots community football engagement and elite football pathways for juniors, youth and senior players.

Current squad

Honours

 Lotto Sport Italia NRFL Division 2
Champions (1): 2016

References

Association football clubs in Auckland
1964 establishments in New Zealand
Association football clubs established in 1964